Domingo Garcia Hindoyan (born in Caracas, February 15, 1980) is an Armenian-Venezuelan conductor and violinist.

Biography
Hindoyan is the son of Domingo Garcia, a Venezuelan violinist and former president of the Orquesta Sinfonica Venezuela, and Viki Hindoyan, a lawyer at the Venezuelan National Parliament. Hindoyan is of Armenian descent through his mother, who was born in Aleppo, Syria.  He began his music studies as a violinist and member of the Venezuelan musical education program El Sistema.   He obtained a master's degree in conducting at the Haute Ecole de Musique de Genève with highest distinction with Laurent Gay.  In 2012, he was invited to join the Allianz International Conductor’s Academy, where he worked with the London Philharmonic Orchestra and The Philharmonia Orchestra, under conductors Esa-Pekka Salonen and Sir Andrew Davis.  He has participated in masterclasses with Bernard Haitink, David Zinman and Jesus Lopez Cobos.

In 2013, Hindoyan was appointed as first assistant conductor to Daniel Barenboim at the Deutsche Staatsoper Berlin.  He made his Metropolitan Opera conducting debut in January 2018.  Other debuts during the 2017–2018 season included appearances at the Oper Stuttgart, with Giacomo Puccini's Tosca, and at the Monte-Carlo Opera, with Vincenzo Bellini's I puritani.

In June 2019, Hindoyan first guest-conducted the Royal Liverpool Philharmonic (RLPO).  He became principal guest conductor of the Polish National Radio Symphony Orchestra in September 2019.  In June 2020, the RLPO announced the appointment of Hindoyan as its next chief conductor, with effect from the 2021–2022 season.  This appointment marks his first chief conductor post.  With the RLPO, Hindoyan made his conducting debut at The Proms in September 2021.

Hindoyan is married to the soprano Sonya Yoncheva.  The couple have two children, a son, Mateo, born on 6 October 2014, and a daughter, Sofia, born in October 2019.  The family resides in canton Vaud, Switzerland.

References

External links 
 Official website of Domingo Hindoyan 
 Askonas Holt agency page on Domingo Hindoyan
 Twitter feed of Domingo Hindoyan
 Facebook page on Domingo Hindoyan

Living people
1980 births
Venezuelan conductors (music)
Armenian conductors (music)
Male conductors (music)
21st-century conductors (music)
Musicians from Caracas
21st-century male musicians